King Of Christmas is a Pennsylvania-based online store which specializes in artificial Christmas trees and Christmas accessories. King of Christmas models their artificial trees after the most commonly used Christmas trees.

History
The company was established in November 2012 to make artificial Christmas trees, after which it has grown out to be one of the largest online Christmas retailers.

The company has received coverage in mainstream media such as Fox News, Star-News, Good News Network, The Doctors TV Show, and CBS News, among others.

References

Retail companies established in 2012
Retail companies of the United States
Companies based in New York (state)